Baron Ongley, of Old Warden, was a title in the Peerage of Ireland. It was created on 30 July 1776 for Robert Henley-Ongley, Member of Parliament for Bedford and Bedfordshire. Born Robert Henley, he assumed the additional surname of Ongley as heir of his great-uncle Sir Samuel Ongley, of Old Warden, Bedfordshire. The barony became extinct on the death of his grandson, the third Baron, on 21 January 1877.

Barons Ongley (1776)
Robert Henley-Ongley, 1st Baron Ongley (–1785)
Robert Henley-Ongley, 2nd Baron Ongley (1771–1814)
Robert Henley-Ongley, 3rd Baron Ongley (1803–1877)

References

Extinct baronies in the Peerage of Ireland
Noble titles created in 1776